John Tyler Sr. (February 28, 1747 – January 6, 1813) was an American lawyer, planter, politician and judge who served in the Virginia House of Delegates and became 15th Governor of Virginia and later United States district judge of the United States District Court for the District of Virginia. He was the father of U.S. President John Tyler.

Early life and education

Born on February 28, 1747, in James City County, Colony of Virginia, British America, to the former Anne Contesse, the wife of John Tyler, the marshal of the Colony's vice-admiralty court. His maternal grandfather was Huguenot physician Dr. Louis Contesse. Beginning in 1754, Tyler attended first the grammar school at the College of William & Mary in the colony's capitol, Williamsburg, then the college itself. When he was nineteen, Tyler stood in the lobby of the colony's assembly, the House of Burgesses, and listened to Patrick Henry's speech concerning the Stamp Act 1765, which caused him both to become hostile to the British government, as well as to read law with eminent attorney Robert Carter Nicholas

Career
Tyler was admitted to the Virginia bar and had a private legal practice. Around 1770, Tyler moved to Charles City County. There, in addition to his private legal practice, Tyler operated plantations using enslaved labor. By his marriage in 1776, discussed below, Tyler built Greenway Plantation, where he would raise his family and later die. In the 1787 Virginia tax census, Tyler owned 20 enslaved adults and 14 enslaved children, as well as 12 horses and 75 cattle, and was also taxed for his carriages (which had a total of six wheels).
Meanwhile, as relations with Britain became strained, Tyler became a member of the Charles City County Committee of Safety. In 1775, he raised a company of troops. He joined his forces with those led by Patrick Henry to demand the restoration of the gunpowder Virginia's governor Lord Dunmore had removed from the government magazine in Williamsburg, or else compensation. In 1776 Tyler accepted a one-year appointment as commissioner in admiralty.

Tyler's statewide political career began in 1778, as he first won election as one of Charles City County's delegates to the Virginia House of Delegates. Charles City County voters re-elected him annually until 1788. Furthermore, fellow delegates elected Tyler as their Speaker in 1781, when he succeeded Benjamin Harrison (who legislators had elected the Governor), and re-elected Tyler until 1785, when Benjamin Harrison became the Speaker).

In addition to his legislative service, Tyler served as a Judge of the Virginia High Court of Admiralty from 1776 to 1788. He was a member of the Virginia Council of State (now the Virginia Governor's Council) from 1780 to 1781. Legislators elected Tyler a Judge of the General Court of Virginia starting in 1788.

Virginia ratification convention

Charles City County voters elected Tyler as one of their representatives to the Virginia Ratifying Convention that ultimately ratified the United States Constitution in 1788. During that convocation, fellow delegates elected Tyler the convention's Vice-President. In the debates over ratification of the United States Constitution, like George Mason and Patrick Henry, Tyler was an Anti-Federalist, ultimately voting against the document, although a narrow margin ratified it. Tyler explained his opposition stating, "It has been often observed ... that liberty ought not to be given up without knowing the terms. The gentlemen themselves cannot agree in the construction of various clauses of [the Constitution]; and so long as this is the case, so long shall liberty be in danger."

Governor
Legislators elected Tyler the 15th Governor of Virginia from 1808 to 1811.

Federal judicial service

President James Madison on January 2, 1811, appointed Tyler to a seat on the United States District Court for the District of Virginia vacated by Judge Cyrus Griffin. The United States Senate confirmed the appointment on January 3, 1811. Tyler received his commission on January 7, 1811. Thus, Tyler judged some cases on his circuit with U.S. Supreme Court Chief Justice John Marshall, who had resided in Richmond and who had been a Federalist both during that Ratifying Convention years earlier, and in later elections.

Death and legacy
Tyler died on January 6, 1813, at Greenway Plantation in Charles City County. His official papers as Governor are held by the Library of Virginia.

Tyler County, West Virginia, is named in Tyler's honor.

Family

Tyler married Mary Marot Armistead (1761–1797) in 1777. His wife was the only child of Robert Booth and Ann (Shields) Armistead of King's Creek plantation in York County, Virginia (her ancestor, another Robert Booth, had served as a burgess representing the county in 1653 and 1654-1655. They had eight children, including future President John Tyler.

References

1747 births
1813 deaths
John Tyler
Fathers of presidents of the United States
Fathers of vice presidents of the United States
Governors of Virginia
Speakers of the Virginia House of Delegates
Justices of the Supreme Court of Virginia
Judges of the United States District Court for the District of Virginia
United States federal judges appointed by James Madison
American people of English descent
People from Charles City County, Virginia
American planters
American slave owners
College of William & Mary alumni
People from York County, Virginia
Virginia colonial people
Continental Army soldiers
People of Virginia in the American Revolution
19th-century American politicians
19th-century American judges
United States federal judges admitted to the practice of law by reading law